Madge Tyrone was an American actress, film editor, and screenwriter active during Hollywood's silent era.

Biography 
Born in New York, Tyrone began her career as a stage actress, appearing in plays touring around the East Coast as early as 1911. Her first known credit was in a Broadway play from 1911 called The Wife Decides. She also worked as a newspaperwoman and magazine writer before beginning her career in Hollywood.

By 1914, she was living in Los Angeles, where she appeared in a number of Our Mutual Girl serials produced by Reliance Film Company. She'd appear in a few more films as an actress before taking up writing and editing.

In 1920, Louis B. Mayer added her to First National's story department. She worked with director Edwin Carewe on a number of projects—from Rio Grande to The Lady Who Lied—and was considered one of his proteges.

In 1922, she was involved in a bad car accident in Los Angeles; she made a full recovery after taking some time off. 

Little is known about her life after 1925.

Selected filmography 
As a writer:

 The Lady Who Lied (1925)
 Rose o' the Sea (1925)
 The Invisible Fear (1921)
 Habit (1921)
 The Woman in His House (1920)
 Rio Grande (1920)

As an editor:

 One Clear Call (1922)
 The Child Thou Gavest Me (1921)

As an actress:

 One Day (1916)
 The House of Tears (1915)
 Our Mutual Girl (1914) (serial)

External links

References 

American women screenwriters
American film actresses
20th-century American actresses
20th-century American writers
Year of birth missing
Year of death missing